Tsudagawa Dam is a gravity dam located in Shimane Prefecture in Japan. The dam is used for flood control. The catchment area of the dam is 12.1 km2. The dam impounds about 4  ha of land when full and can store 340 thousand cubic meters of water. The construction of the dam was completed in 1975.

References

Dams in Shimane Prefecture
1975 establishments in Japan